California's 40th State Assembly district is one of 80 California State Assembly districts. It is currently represented by Democrat James Ramos of Highland.

District profile 
The district encompasses parts of the Inland Empire. This plurality-Latino district forms a semicircular arc stretching from Rancho Cucamonga to Redlands, surrounding the much more heavily-Latino 47th district on the west, north, and east.

San Bernardino County – 22.7%
 Highland
 Loma Linda
 Rancho Cucamonga – 87.7%
 Redlands
 San Bernardino – 68.0%

Election results from statewide races

List of Assembly Members 
Due to redistricting, the 40th district has been moved around different parts of the state. The current iteration resulted from the 2011 redistricting by the California Citizens Redistricting Commission.

Election results 1992 - present

2020

2018

2016

2014

2012

2010

2008

2006

2004

2002

2000

1998

1996

1994

1992

See also 
 California State Assembly
 California State Assembly districts
 Districts in California

References

External links 
 District map from the California Citizens Redistricting Commission

40
Government of San Bernardino County, California
Loma Linda, California
Rancho Cucamonga, California
Redlands, California
San Bernardino, California